Mário Moniz Pereira (February 11, 1921 – July 31, 2016) was a teacher, sportsman, athlete, coach and songwriter. He practiced handball, basketball, football, roller hockey, table tennis, volleyball and athletics.  He was also a songwriter and poet, author of fados sung by national fadistas like Valeu a Pena, Fado Varina, Rosa da Madragoa, Rosa da Noite, Não me Conformo, Leio em teus Olhos, among many others.

Coaching
Pereira was the only coach for Carlos Lopes who won three World Cross Country Championships as well as the Olympic Gold Medal in the Marathon at the 1984 Summer Olympics in Los Angeles.

References

1921 births
2016 deaths
Portuguese educators
Portuguese male athletes
Portuguese songwriters
Male songwriters
Portuguese sports coaches
Portuguese sportsmen
Sporting CP

Sportspeople from Lisbon